The Portland Gay Men's Chorus (PGMC) is a gay-identified, non-profit choral group based in Portland, Oregon.  The group was founded in the spring of 1980 when three founding members, inspired by a performance of the San Francisco Gay Men's Chorus, placed an ad in a local gay newspaper looking for potential members. Soon after, on June 19, 1980, the group sang in their inaugural concert at the Metropolitan Community Church of Portland.  PGMC is the fourth oldest chorus to publicly identify as gay by using that description in their official name.

Since its founding, PGMC has been active in the civic and cultural life of Portland and Oregon. The group has performed at places and events as varied as the openings of Pioneer Courthouse Square and the Oregon Convention Center, the Oregon Zoo, Portland City Club, the Oregon State Legislature, and the inauguration of Oregon Secretary of State Barbara Roberts in 1985.

References

External links 

 Official Website Portland Gay Men's Chorus
 Oregon Art Beat:  Portland Gay Men’s Chorus

1980 establishments in Oregon
Choirs in Oregon
Gay culture in Oregon
Gay men's choruses
LGBT culture in Portland, Oregon
Musical groups established in 1980
Musical groups from Portland, Oregon